Soehrensia spachiana, commonly known as the golden torch, (white) torch cactus or golden column, is a species of cactus native to South America. Previously known as Trichocereus spachianus for many years, it is commonly cultivated as a pot or rockery plant worldwide. It has a columnar habit, with a lime-green cylindrical body with 1–2 cm long golden spines.

Description
Vertical branches arise from the base of the plant. Each column has 10–15 rounded ribs. The large areoles are around 1 cm apart, and have wavy yellow hairs. The straight spines are red-yellow initially, fading to white as they age. In their native habitat, the flowers appear in June–July and open at night.

Taxonomy
French botanist Charles Antoine Lemaire described the species as Cereus spachianus in 1839, in honour of his countryman Édouard Spach. The type specimen was collected in Argentina, though where in the country is unclear. Alwin Berger erected the subgenus Trichocereus in 1905, incorporating this species. Vincenzo Riccobono elevated Trichocereus to genus status in 1909, and hence it was for many years known as Trichocereus spachianus. The genus encompassed a number of columnar cacti, before being subsumed into Echinopsis. However, a 2012 genetic analysis of chloroplast DNA indicates Echinopsis is made up of several divergent lineages. E. spachiana was not included in the study but is thought to be related to a Helianthocereus clade.

Distribution and habitat
Soehrensia  spachiana is native to western Argentina. It is a declared weed in South Africa.

References

spachiana
Cacti of South America